The 1964 United States presidential election was the 45th quadrennial presidential election. It was held on Tuesday, November 3, 1964. Incumbent Democratic United States President Lyndon B. Johnson defeated Barry Goldwater, the Republican nominee, in a landslide. With 61.1% of the popular vote, Lyndon B. Johnson won the largest share of the popular vote of any candidate since the largely uncontested 1820 election, in which no candidate of either party has been able to match or surpass.

Johnson took office on November 22, 1963 and emphasized the continuation of his assassinated predecessor, John F. Kennedy. He easily defeated a primary challenge by Governor George Wallace of Alabama, to win the nomination to a full term. At the 1964 Democratic National Convention, Johnson selected Senator Hubert Humphrey of Minnesota as his running mate.  In the Republican contest Senator Barry Goldwater of Arizona, a leader of his party's conservative faction, defeated liberal Governor Nelson Rockefeller of New York and Governor William Scranton of Pennsylvania.

Johnson championed his passage of the Civil Rights Act, and advocated a series of anti-poverty programs collectively known as the Great Society. Goldwater espoused a low-tax, small-government philosophy. Although he supported previous attempts at enacting civil rights legislation in 1957 and 1960, Goldwater reluctantly opposed the Civil Rights Act of 1964, saying it violated individual liberty and states' rights. Democrats successfully portrayed Goldwater as a dangerous extremist, most famously in the "Daisy" television advertisement. The Republicans were divided between its moderate and conservative factions, with Rockefeller and other moderate party leaders refusing to campaign for Goldwater. Johnson led by wide margins in all polls during the campaign.

Johnson carried 44 states and the District of Columbia, which voted for the first time in this election. Goldwater won his home state and swept the five states of the Deep South, most of which had not voted for a Republican presidential candidate since the end of Reconstruction in 1877. This was the last election in which the Democratic Party won a majority of the white vote, with 59% of white voters shunning Goldwater for Johnson.

This was the last election in which the Democratic nominee carried Idaho, Utah, Wyoming, North Dakota, South Dakota, Nebraska, Kansas, or Oklahoma, and the only election ever in which the Democrat carried Alaska. This marked the first presidential election in history in which a Democrat carried Vermont, and conversely the first in which a Republican carried Georgia. This was also the last election until 1992 in which the Democrat carried California, Colorado, Illinois, Montana, Nevada, New Mexico, New Jersey, New Hampshire, or Vermont, well as the last election until 2008 in which the Democrat carried Virginia or Indiana. As such, this was the most recent presidential election in which the entire Midwestern region voted Democratic. As of 2023, this marks the last time that a Democratic presidential candidate has won more than 400 electoral votes.

Johnson's landslide victory coincided with the defeat of many conservative Republican congressmen. The subsequent 89th Congress would pass major legislation such as the Social Security Amendments of 1965 and the Voting Rights Act of 1965. The 1964 election marked the beginning of a major, long-term re-alignment in American politics, as Goldwater's unsuccessful bid significantly influenced the modern conservative movement. The movement of conservatives to the Republican Party continued, culminating in the 1980 presidential victory of Ronald Reagan.

Assassination of President John F. Kennedy 

President Kennedy was assassinated on November 22, 1963, in Dallas, Texas. Supporters were shocked and saddened by the loss of the charismatic President, while opposition candidates were put in the awkward position of running against the policies of a slain political figure.

During the following period of mourning, Republican leaders called for a political moratorium, so as not to appear disrespectful. As such, little politicking was done by the candidates of either major party until January 1964, when the primary season officially began. At the time, most political pundits saw Kennedy's assassination as leaving the nation politically unsettled.

Nominations

Democratic Party

Candidates 

The only candidate other than President Johnson to actively campaign was then-Alabama Governor George Wallace, who ran in a number of northern primaries, though his candidacy was more to promote the philosophy of states' rights among a northern audience; while expecting some support from delegations in the South, Wallace was certain that he was not in contention for the Democratic nomination. Johnson received 1,106,999 votes in the primaries.

At the national convention, the integrated Mississippi Freedom Democratic Party (MFDP) claimed the seats for delegates for Mississippi, not on the grounds of Party rules, but because the official Mississippi delegation had been elected by a white primary system. The national party's liberal leaders supported an even division of the seats between the two Mississippi delegations; Johnson was concerned that, while the regular Democrats of Mississippi would probably vote for Goldwater anyway, rejecting them would lose him the South. Eventually, Hubert Humphrey, Walter Reuther, and the black civil rights leaders, including Roy Wilkins, Martin Luther King Jr., and Bayard Rustin, worked out a compromise: The MFDP took two seats; the regular Mississippi delegation was required to pledge to support the party ticket; and no future Democratic convention would accept a delegation chosen by a discriminatory poll. Joseph L. Rauh Jr., the MFDP's lawyer, initially refused this deal, but they eventually took their seats. Many white delegates from Mississippi and Alabama refused to sign any pledge, and left the convention; and many young civil rights workers were offended by any compromise. Johnson biographers Rowland Evans and Robert Novak claim that the MFDP fell under the influence of "black radicals" and rejected their seats. Johnson lost Louisiana, Alabama, Mississippi, Georgia, and South Carolina.

Johnson also faced trouble from Robert F. Kennedy, President Kennedy's younger brother and the U.S. Attorney General. Kennedy and Johnson's relationship was troubled from the time Robert Kennedy was a Senate staffer. Then-Majority Leader Johnson surmised that Kennedy's hostility was the direct result of the fact that Johnson frequently recounted a story that embarrassed Kennedy's father, Joseph P. Kennedy, the ambassador to the United Kingdom. According to his recounting, Johnson and President Franklin D. Roosevelt misled the ambassador, upon a return visit to the United States, to believe that Roosevelt wished to meet in Washington for friendly purposes; in fact, Roosevelt planned to — and did — fire the ambassador, due to the ambassador's well publicized views. The Johnson–Kennedy hostility was rendered mutual in the 1960 primaries and the 1960 Democratic National Convention, when Robert Kennedy had tried to prevent Johnson from becoming his brother's running mate, a move that deeply embittered both men.

In early 1964, despite his personal animosity for the president, Kennedy had tried to force Johnson to accept him as his running mate. Johnson eliminated this threat by announcing that none of his cabinet members would be considered for second place on the Democratic ticket. Johnson also became concerned that Kennedy might use his scheduled speech at the 1964 Democratic Convention to create a groundswell of emotion among the delegates to make him Johnson's running mate; he prevented this by deliberately scheduling Kennedy's speech on the last day of the convention, after his running mate had already been chosen. Shortly after the 1964 Democratic Convention, Kennedy decided to leave Johnson's cabinet and run for the U.S. Senate in New York; he won the general election in November. Johnson chose United States Senator Hubert Humphrey from Minnesota, a liberal and civil rights activist, as his running mate.

Republican Party

Candidates

Primaries 

The Republican Party (GOP) was badly divided in 1964 between its conservative and moderate-liberal factions. Former vice president Richard Nixon, who had been beaten by Kennedy in the extremely close 1960 presidential election, decided not to run. Nixon, a moderate with ties to both wings of the GOP, had been able to unite the factions in 1960; in his absence, the way was clear for the two factions to engage in a hard-fought campaign for the nomination. Barry Goldwater, a Senator from Arizona, was the champion of the conservatives. The conservatives had historically been based in the American Midwest, but beginning in the 1950s, they had been gaining in power in the South and West, and the core of Goldwater's support came from suburban conservative Republicans. The conservatives favored a low-tax, small federal government which supported individual rights and business interests, and opposed social welfare programs. They also supported an internationalist and interventionist foreign policy. The conservatives resented the dominance of the GOP's moderate wing, which was based in the Northeastern United States. Since 1940, the Eastern moderates had defeated conservative presidential candidates at the GOP's national conventions. The conservatives believed the Eastern Republicans were little different from liberal Democrats in their philosophy and approach to government. Goldwater's chief opponent for the Republican nomination was Nelson Rockefeller, the Governor of New York and the long-time leader of the GOP's liberal faction.

In 1961, a group of twenty-two conservatives, headed by Ohio Congressman John M. Ashbrook, lawyer and National Review publisher William A. Rusher, and scholar F. Clifton White, met privately in Chicago to discuss the formation of a grass-roots organization to secure the nomination of a conservative as the 1964 Republican candidate. The main headquarters for the organization were established at Suite 3505 of the Chanin Building in New York City, leading members to refer to themselves as the "Suite 3505 Committee". Following the 1962 mid-term elections, they formally backed Goldwater, who notified them that he did not want to run for the presidency. In April 1963, they formed the Draft Goldwater Committee, chaired by Texas Republican Party Chairman Peter O'Donnell. The committee solidified growing conservative strength in the West and South, and began working to gain control of state parties in the Midwest from liberal Republicans. Throughout the rest of the year, speculation about a potential Goldwater candidacy grew, and grass-roots activism and efforts among conservative Republicans expanded.

Initially, Rockefeller was considered the front-runner, ahead of Goldwater. However, in 1963, two years after Rockefeller's divorce from his first wife, he married Margaretta "Happy" Murphy, who was nearly 18 years younger than he and had just divorced her husband and surrendered her four children to his custody. The fact that Murphy had suddenly divorced her husband before marrying Rockefeller led to rumors that Rockefeller had been having an extra-marital affair with her. This angered many social conservatives and female voters within the GOP, many of whom called Rockefeller a "wife stealer". After his re-marriage, Rockefeller's lead among Republicans lost 20 points overnight. Senator Prescott Bush of Connecticut, the father of President George H. W. Bush and grandfather of President George W. Bush, was among Rockefeller's critics on this issue: "Have we come to the point in our life as a nation where the governor of a great state — one who perhaps aspires to the nomination for president of the United States — can desert a good wife, mother of his grown children, divorce her, then persuade a young mother of four youngsters to abandon her husband and their four children and marry the governor?"

In the first primary, in New Hampshire, both Rockefeller and Goldwater were considered to be the favorites, but the voters instead gave a surprising victory to the U.S. ambassador to South Vietnam, Henry Cabot Lodge Jr., Nixon's running mate in 1960 and a former Massachusetts senator. Lodge was a write-in candidate. He went on to win the Massachusetts and New Jersey primaries, before withdrawing his candidacy because he had finally decided he did not want the Republican nomination.

Despite his defeat in New Hampshire, Goldwater pressed on, winning the Illinois, Texas, and Indiana primaries, with little opposition, and Nebraska's primary, after a stiff challenge from a draft-Nixon movement. Goldwater also won a number of state caucuses, and gathered even more delegates. Meanwhile, Nelson Rockefeller won the West Virginia and Oregon primaries against Goldwater, and William Scranton won in his home state of Pennsylvania. Both Rockefeller and Scranton also won several state caucuses, mostly in the Northeast.

The final showdown between Goldwater and Rockefeller was in the California primary. In spite of the previous accusations regarding his marriage, Rockefeller led Goldwater in most opinion polls in California, and he appeared headed for victory when his new wife gave birth to a son, Nelson Rockefeller Jr., three days before the primary. His son's birth brought the issue of adultery front and center, and Rockefeller suddenly lost ground in the polls. Combined with Goldwater conservatives' expanded dedicated efforts and superior organizing, Goldwater won the primary by a narrow 51–48% margin, thus eliminating Rockefeller as a serious contender and all but clinching the nomination. With Rockefeller's elimination, the party's moderates and liberals turned to William Scranton, the Governor of Pennsylvania, in the hopes that he could stop Goldwater. However, as the Republican Convention began, Goldwater was seen as the heavy favorite to win the nomination. This was notable, as it signified a shift to a more conservative-leaning Republican Party.

Total popular vote

 Barry Goldwater – 2,267,079 (38.33%)
 Nelson Rockefeller – 1,304,204 (22.05%)
 Jim Rhodes – 615,754 (10.41%)
 Henry Cabot Lodge Jr. – 386,661 (6.54%)
 John W. Byrnes – 299,612 (5.07%)
 William Scranton – 245,401 (4.15%)
 Margaret Chase Smith – 227,007 (3.84%)
 Richard Nixon – 197,212 (3.33%)
 Unpledged – 173,652 (2.94%)
 Harold Stassen – 114,083 (1.93%)
 Other – 58,933 (0.99%)
 Lyndon B. Johnson (write-in) – 23,406 (0.40%)
 George W. Romney – 1,955 (0.03%)

Convention 
The 1964 Republican National Convention, July 13–16 at Daly City, California's Cow Palace arena, was one of the most bitter on record. The party's moderates and conservatives openly expressed their contempt for each other. Rockefeller was loudly booed when he came to the podium for his speech; in his speech, he roundly criticized the party's conservatives, which led many conservatives in the galleries to yell and scream at him. A group of moderates tried to rally behind Scranton to stop Goldwater, but Goldwater's forces easily brushed his challenge aside, and Goldwater was nominated on the first ballot. The presidential tally was as follows:

Barry Goldwater 883
William Scranton 214
Nelson Rockefeller 114
George W. Romney 41
Margaret Chase Smith 27
Walter Judd 22
Hiram Fong 5
Henry Cabot Lodge Jr. 2

The vice-presidential nomination went to little-known Republican Party Chairman William E. Miller, a Representative from western New York. Goldwater stated that he chose Miller simply because "he drives [President] Johnson nuts". This would be the only Republican ticket between 1952 and 1976 that did not include Nixon.

In accepting his nomination, Goldwater uttered his most famous phrase (a quote from Cicero suggested by speechwriter Harry Jaffa): "I would remind you that extremism in the defense of liberty is no vice. And let me remind you also that moderation in the pursuit of justice is no virtue." For many GOP moderates, Goldwater's speech was seen as a deliberate insult, and many of these moderates would defect to the Democrats in the fall election.

General election

Campaign 

Although Goldwater had been successful in rallying conservatives, he was unable to broaden his base of support for the general election. Shortly before the Republican Convention, he had alienated moderate and liberal Republicans by his vote against the Civil Rights Act of 1964, which Johnson supported following Kennedy's death and signed into law. While a staunch supporter of racial equality, having voted in favor of the 1957 and 1960 Civil Rights acts bills and the 24th Amendment to the Constitution, Goldwater felt that desegregation was primarily a states' rights issue, rather than a national policy, and believed the 1964 act to be unconstitutional. Goldwater's vote against the legislation helped cause African-Americans to overwhelmingly support Johnson. Goldwater had previously voted in favor of the 1957 and 1960 Civil Rights acts, but only after proposing "restrictive amendments" to them. Goldwater was famous for speaking "off-the-cuff" at times, and many of his former statements were given wide publicity by the Democrats. In the early 1960s, Goldwater had called the Eisenhower administration "a dime store New Deal", and the former president never fully forgave him or offered him his full support in the election.

In December 1961, he told a news conference that "sometimes, I think this country would be better off if we could just saw off the Eastern Seaboard and let it float out to sea", a remark which indicated his dislike of the liberal economic and social policies that were often associated with that part of the nation. That comment came back to hurt him, in the form of a Johnson television commercial, as did remarks about making Social Security voluntary (something that even his running mate Miller felt would lead to the destruction of the system) and selling the Tennessee Valley Authority. In his most famous verbal gaffe, Goldwater once joked that the U.S. military should "lob one [a nuclear bomb] into the men's room of the Kremlin" in the Soviet Union.

Goldwater was also hurt by the reluctance of many prominent moderate Republicans to support him. Governors Nelson Rockefeller of New York and George W. Romney of Michigan refused to endorse Goldwater due to his stance on civil rights and his proposal to make Social Security voluntary, and did not campaign for him. On the other hand, former Vice President Richard Nixon and Governor William Scranton of Pennsylvania loyally supported the GOP ticket and campaigned for Goldwater, although Nixon did not entirely agree with Goldwater's political stances and said that it would "be a tragedy" if Goldwater's platform were not "challenged and repudiated" by the Republicans. Scranton also felt that Goldwater's proposal of voluntarizing Social Security was the "worst kind of fiscal responsibility". The New York Herald-Tribune, a voice for eastern Republicans (and a target for Goldwater activists during the primaries), supported Johnson in the general election. Some moderates even formed a "Republicans for Johnson" organization, although most prominent GOP politicians avoided being associated with it.

Shortly before the Republican convention, CBS reporter Daniel Schorr wrote from Germany that, "It looks as though Senator Goldwater, if nominated, will be starting his campaign here in Bavaria, center of Germany's right wing". He noted that a prior Goldwater interview with the German magazine Der Spiegel was an "appeal to right-wing elements". However, there was no ulterior motive for the trip; it was just a vacation.

Fact magazine published an article polling psychiatrists around the country as to Goldwater's sanity. Some 1,189 psychiatrists appeared to agree that Goldwater was "emotionally unstable" and unfit for office, though none of the members had actually interviewed him. The article received heavy publicity and resulted in a change to the ethics guidelines of the American Psychiatric Association. In a libel suit, a federal court awarded Goldwater $1 in compensatory damages, and $75,000 in punitive damages.

Eisenhower's strong backing could have been an asset to the Goldwater campaign, but instead, its absence was clearly noticed. When questioned about the presidential capabilities of the former president's younger brother, university administrator Milton S. Eisenhower, in July 1964, Goldwater replied: "One Eisenhower in a generation is enough." However, Eisenhower did not openly repudiate Goldwater, and made one television commercial for Goldwater's campaign. A prominent Hollywood celebrity who vigorously supported Goldwater was Ronald Reagan. Reagan gave a well-received televised speech supporting Goldwater; it was so popular that Goldwater's advisors had it played on local television stations around the nation. Many historians consider this speech — "A Time for Choosing" — to mark the beginning of Reagan's transformation from an actor to a political leader. In 1966, Reagan would be elected Governor of California.

Meanwhile, President Johnson was concerned he could lose the election by appearing soft on Communism. On July 30, South Vietnamese commandos tried to attack the North Vietnamese radar station on the island of Hon Me, with the USS Maddox sufficiently close that the North Vietnamese believed it was there to provide cover for that commando raid. North Vietnam filed an official complaint with the International Control Commission, accusing the United States of being behind the raid. On August 2, the Maddox reported having been attacked by three North Vietnamese Navy torpedo boats. Johnson called Soviet Premier Khrushchev, saying the US did not want war and asking the Soviets to convince North Vietnam to not attack American warships. The next day, August 3, South Vietnamese raided Cape Vinhson and Cua Ron. That night, in the middle of a thunderstorm, the Maddox intercepted radio messages that gave them "the 'impression' that Communist patrol boats were bracing for [another] assault". The pilots didn't see anything, but the Maddox and the nearby  started shooting in all directions. However, after the incident, all US personnel involved acknowledged they had neither seen nor heard Communist gunfire. Nevertheless, Johnson and an aide Kenneth O'Donnell agreed that Johnson "would have to respond firmly to defend himself against Goldwater and the Republican right wing". Johnson denounced the attack as "unprovoked" and secured essentially a blank check to do anything he thought necessary in Vietnam, and left Goldwater looking like an irresponsible hawk.

Ads and slogans

Johnson positioned himself as a moderate, and succeeded in portraying Goldwater as an extremist. CIA Director William Colby asserted that Tracy Barnes instructed the CIA to spy on the Goldwater campaign and the Republican National Committee, to provide information to Johnson's campaign; E. Howard Hunt, later implicated as a ringleader in the Watergate scandal, disputed this, instead claiming the operation had been ordered by the White House.

Goldwater had a habit of making blunt statements about war, nuclear weapons, and economics that could be turned against him. Most famously, the Johnson campaign broadcast a television commercial on September 7 dubbed the "Daisy Girl" ad, which featured a little girl picking petals from a daisy in a field, counting the petals, which then segues into a launch countdown and a nuclear explosion. The ads were in response to Goldwater's advocacy of "tactical" nuclear weapons use in Vietnam. "Confessions of a Republican", another Johnson ad, features a monologue from a man who tells viewers that he had previously voted for Eisenhower and Nixon, but now worries about the "men with strange ideas", "weird groups", and "the head of the Ku Klux Klan" who were supporting Goldwater; he concludes that "either they're not Republicans, or I'm not". Voters increasingly viewed Goldwater as a right-wing fringe candidate. His slogan, "In your heart, you know he's right", was successfully parodied by the Johnson campaign into, "In your guts, you know he's nuts", or, "In your heart, you know he might" (as in "he might push the nuclear button"), or even, "In your heart, he's too far right".

The Johnson campaign's greatest concern may have been voter complacency leading to low turnout in key states. To counter this, all of Johnson's broadcast ads concluded with the line: "Vote for President Johnson on November 3. The stakes are too high for you to stay home." The Democratic campaign used two other slogans: "All the way with LBJ"; and, "LBJ for the USA".

The election campaign was disrupted for a week by the death of former president Herbert Hoover on October 20, 1964, because it was considered disrespectful to be campaigning during a time of mourning. Hoover died of natural causes. He had been U.S. president from 1929 to 1933. Both major candidates attended his funeral.

Johnson led in all opinion polls by huge margins throughout the entire campaign.

Results 

The election was held on November 3, 1964. Johnson beat Goldwater in the general election, winning over 61% of the popular vote, the highest percentage since the popular vote first became widespread in 1824. Johnson became the only Democrat between 1944 and 1976 to win a majority of the popular vote. In the end, Goldwater won only his native state of Arizona and five Deep South states — Louisiana, Mississippi, Georgia, Alabama, and South Carolina — which had been increasingly alienated by Democratic civil rights policies, and where Jim Crow laws tended to be still active to varying degrees, before the following year's Voting Rights Act outlawed them entirely.

The five Southern states that voted for Goldwater swung over dramatically to support him. For instance, in Mississippi, where Democrat Franklin D. Roosevelt had won 97% of the popular vote in 1936, Goldwater won 87% of the vote. Of these states, Louisiana had been the only state where a Republican had won even once since Reconstruction. Mississippi, Alabama, and South Carolina had not voted Republican in any presidential election since Reconstruction, whilst Georgia had never voted Republican even during Reconstruction (thus making Goldwater the first Republican to ever carry Georgia).

The 1964 election was a major transition point for the South, and an important step in the process by which the Democrats' former "Solid South" became a Republican bastion. Nonetheless, Johnson still managed to eke out a bare popular majority of 51–49% (6.307 to 5.993 million) in the eleven former Confederate states. Conversely, Johnson was the first Democrat ever to carry the state of Vermont in a presidential election, and only the second Democrat, after Woodrow Wilson in 1912, when the Republican Party was divided, to carry Maine in the twentieth century. Maine and Vermont had been the only states that FDR had failed to carry during any of his four successful presidential bids.

Around twenty percent of the people who had voted for Nixon in the 1960 election switched their support to Johnson. Of the 3,126 counties/districts/independent cities making returns, Johnson won in 2,275 (72.77%), while Goldwater carried 826 (26.42%). Unpledged electors carried six counties in Alabama (0.19%).

The Johnson landslide defeated many conservative Republican congressmen, giving him a majority that could overcome the conservative coalition.

This is the first election to have the participation of the District of Columbia, under the 23rd Amendment to the US Constitution.

The Johnson campaign broke two American election records previously held by Franklin Roosevelt: the most Electoral College votes won by a major-party candidate running for the White House for the first time (with 486 to the 472 won by Roosevelt in 1932); and the largest share of the popular vote under the current Democratic/Republican competition (Roosevelt won 60.8% nationwide, Johnson 61.1%). This first-time electoral count was exceeded when Ronald Reagan won 489 votes in 1980. Johnson retains the highest percentage of the popular vote, as of the 2020 presidential election. Johnson was the first Southern president since Andrew Johnson from 1865-1869, and the first elected since Zachary Taylor in 1848. 

Source (popular vote): 

Source (electoral vote):

Geography of results

Cartographic gallery

Results by state

Voter demographics 

Source:

Close states 
Margin of victory less than 5% (23 electoral votes):
Arizona, 1.00% (4,782 votes)
Idaho, 1.83% (5,363 votes)
Florida, 2.30% (42,599 votes)

Margin of victory over 5%, but less than 10% (40 electoral votes):
Nebraska, 5.22% (30,460 votes) 
Virginia, 7.36% (76,704 votes)
Georgia, 8.25% (94,027 votes)
Kansas, 9.03% (77,449 votes)
Utah, 9.73% (38,946 votes)

Tipping point:

Washington, 24.59% (309,515 votes)

Statistics 

Counties with highest percent of vote (Democratic)
 Duval County, Texas 92.55%
 Knott County, Kentucky 90.61%
 Webb County, Texas 90.08%
 Jim Hogg County, Texas 89.87%
 Menominee County, Wisconsin 89.12%

Counties with highest percent of vote (Republican)
 Holmes County, Mississippi 96.59%
 Noxubee County, Mississippi 96.59%
 Amite County, Mississippi 96.38%
 Leake County, Mississippi 96.23%
 Franklin County, Mississippi 96.05%

Counties with highest percent of vote (other)
 Macon County, Alabama 61.54%
 Limestone County, Alabama 56.01%
 Jackson County, Alabama 53.53%
 Lauderdale County, Alabama 52.45%
 Colbert County, Alabama 51.41%

Consequences 
Although Goldwater was decisively defeated, some political pundits and historians believe he laid the foundation for the conservative revolution to follow. Among them is Richard Perlstein, historian of the American conservative movement, who wrote of Goldwater's defeat: "Here was one time, at least, when history was written by the losers." Ronald Reagan's speech on Goldwater's behalf, grass-roots organization, and the conservative takeover (although temporary in the 1960s) of the Republican party would all help to bring about the "Reagan Revolution" of the 1980s.

Johnson went from his victory in the 1964 election to launch the Great Society program at home, signing the Voting Rights Act of 1965 and starting the War on Poverty. He also escalated the Vietnam War, which eroded his popularity. By 1968, Johnson's popularity had declined, and the Democrats became so split over his candidacy that he withdrew as a candidate. Moreover, his support of civil rights for blacks helped split white union members and Southerners away from Franklin D. Roosevelt's Democratic New Deal Coalition, which would later lead to the phenomenon of the "Reagan Democrat". Of the 14 presidential elections that followed up to 2020, Democrats would win only six times, although in eight of those elections, the Democratic candidate received the highest number of popular votes.

The election also furthered the shift of the black voting electorate away from the Republican Party, a phenomenon which had begun with the New Deal. Since the 1964 election, Democratic presidential candidates have almost consistently won 80–95% of the black vote in each presidential election.

See also 
Conservatism in the United States
History of the United States (1964–1980)
History of the United States Democratic Party
History of the United States Republican Party
Second inauguration of Lyndon B. Johnson
1964 United States gubernatorial elections
1964 United States House of Representatives elections
1964 United States Senate elections
Natural born citizen of the United States (regarding Goldwater's constitutional eligibility to be president)
Scientists and Engineers for Johnson–Humphrey

Notes

References

Sources

Further reading

 Annunziata, Frank. "The Revolt Against the Welfare State: Goldwater Conservatism and the Election of 1964." Presidential Studies Quarterly 10.2 (1980): 254-265. online

 – a political fiction novel around the Republican campaign.

 Converse, Philip E., Aage R. Clausen, and Warren E. Miller. "Electoral myth and reality: the 1964 election." American Political Science Review 59.2 (1965): 321-336. online, widely cited based on voter surveys.

 Davies, Gareth, and Julian E. Zelizer, eds. America at the Ballot Box: Elections and Political History (2015) pp. 184–195, role of liberalism.

 Erikson, Robert S. "The influence of newspaper endorsements in presidential elections: The case of 1964." American Journal of Political Science (1976): 207-233. online
Evans, Rowland, and Novak, Robert (1966). Lyndon B. Johnson: The Exercise of Power.
 Farrington, Joshua D. (2020). "Evicted from the Party: Black Republicans and the 1964 Election". Journal of Arizona History 61.1: 127–148.

 Johnstone, Andrew , and Andrew Priest, eds.  US Presidential Elections and Foreign Policy: Candidates, Campaigns, and Global Politics from FDR to Bill Clinton (2017) pp 154–176.  online
 Jurdem, Laurence R. "'The Media Were Not Completely Fair to You': Foreign Policy, the Press and the 1964 Goldwater Campaign". Journal of Arizona History 61.1 (2020): 161–180.

 Mann, Robert (2011). Daisy Petals and Mushroom Clouds: LBJ, Barry Goldwater and the Ad That Changed American Politics. Louisiana State University Press.
 online

 Middendorf, J. William (2006). A Glorious Disaster: Barry Goldwater’s Presidential Campaign and the Origins of the Conservative Movement. Basic Books.

 Rice, Ross R. "The 1964 Elections in the West." Western Political Quarterly 18.2-2 (1965): 431-438, with full articles on each Western state.
 Anderson, Totton J., and Eugene C. Lee. "The 1964 election in California." Western Political Quarterly 18.2-2 (1965): 451-474.

 Schuparra, Kurt. "Barry Goldwater and Southern California Conservatism: Ideology, Image and Myth in the 1964 California Republican Presidential Primary." Southern California Quarterly 74.3 (1992): 277-298. online
 Shermer, Elizabeth Tandy, ed. Barry Goldwater and the remaking of the American political landscape (University of Arizona Press, 2013).

 Young, Nancy Beck. Two Suns of the Southwest: Lyndon Johnson, Barry Goldwater, and the 1964 Battle between Liberalism and Conservatism (UP of Kansas, 2019). online

Primary sources
 Gallup, George H., ed. (1972). The Gallup Poll: Public Opinion, 1935–1971. 3 vols. Random House.
 Chester, Edward W. (1977). A guide to political platforms.
 Porter, Kirk H. and Donald Bruce Johnson, eds. (1973). National party platforms, 1840–1972.

External links 

Campaign commercials from the 1964 election
CONELRAD's definitive history of the Daisy ad
1964 election results: State-by-state Popular vote
1964 popular vote by states (with bar graphs)
1964 popular vote by counties
electoral history
 Election of 1964 in Counting the Votes 

 
Articles containing video clips
Barry Goldwater
Hubert Humphrey
Presidency of Lyndon B. Johnson
Lyndon B. Johnson
November 1964 events in the United States